Nikolayevka is a rural locality (a selo) in Abdrashitovsky Selsoviet, Alsheyevsky District, Bashkortostan, Russia. The population was 2 as of 2010. There is 1 street.

Geography 
Nikolayevka is located 36 km southeast of Rayevsky (the district's administrative centre) by road. Balkan is the nearest rural locality.

References 

Rural localities in Alsheyevsky District